Amber Rose Levonchuck (born October 21, 1983) is an American model, rapper and television personality. She first gained attention after she appeared in the music video for Young Jeezy and Kanye West's single "Put On." In 2008, Rose began a high-profile two-year romantic relationship with West that led her to star in his Louis Vuitton ads. She then signed a modeling contract with Ford Models in 2009. She would attain further prominence after she appeared as a video vixen in numerous hip-hop music videos.

After splitting from West in 2010, Rose began dating rapper Wiz Khalifa, whom she married in 2013. Rose filed for divorce in 2014. Following this, she released her first book, How to Be a Bad Bitch, published by Simon & Schuster.  In 2015, she founded the Los Angeles chapter of the SlutWalk protest march, an annual feminist demonstration founded in Toronto. Rose then hosted her own talk show, entitled The Amber Rose Show, on VH1, which debuted in 2016. That same year, she also began hosting the syndicated radio call-in program Loveline.

Early life 
Amber Levonchuck was born on October 21, 1983, in Philadelphia, Pennsylvania, to Dorothy Rose and Michael Levonchuck. Her father is of Irish and Italian descent and her mother is of Cape Verdean and maternal Scottish descent from Ayrshire. She has one brother named Antonio Hewlett. Rose grew up in South Philadelphia.

Rose claimed to have begun stripping at the age of 15 under the pseudonym "Paris," to provide for her family after her parents' divorce. On Van Lathan's The Red Pill podcast, she claimed that she also attempted to sell crack cocaine, but was not successful.

Modeling career 
Rose's appearance in Young Jeezy and Kanye West's "Put On" video in 2008 caught the attention of West. Rose then gained more exposure after posing for a Louis Vuitton print advertisement featuring West's sneaker line. Rose walked the runway at New York Fashion Week for "Celestino". Rose has also made cameos in music videos such as Nicki Minaj's "Massive Attack," Young Jeezy's "Vacation", Wiz Khalifa's "No Sleep", Fabolous' "You Be Killin' Em", Ludacris' "What Them Girls Like" and Future's "Mask Off". She was signed with modeling agency Ford Models from 2009 to 2010.

In 2010, she appeared in Russell Simmons's reality show about his two assistants, Running Russell Simmons. She also starred in a PSA by NOH8 Campaign. In 2011, Rose was a guest judge on Season 3 of RuPaul's Drag Race. She was also a judge on Season 2 of Master of the Mix. In November 2011, she became the spokesperson for Smirnoff and appeared in television ads and billboards for the company's new flavors Whipped Cream and Fluffed Marshmallow.

Musical pursuits 
Rose released her debut single "Fame," which features Wiz Khalifa, on January 10, 2012, followed by a second single, titled "Loaded," released on February 6, 2012. She then rapped on the eleventh track of her ex-husband's album O.N.I.F.C., titled "Rise Above," along with rappers Tuki Carter and Pharrell Williams, who produced the song. She was managed by Leticia "Tish" Cyrus, mother of singer Miley Cyrus, who is Rose's and her ex-husband Wiz Khalifa's close friend.

Business endeavors 

In September 2009, Rose announced plans to launch her own eyewear line. In 2012, Rose opened a clothing line with her friend Priscilla Ono called Rose & Ono. Rose guest-starred on an episode of Wild 'N Out on MTV2, and had a role as "MaryWanna" in the film School Dance, which was directed by her manager, Nick Cannon in 2014.
Simon & Schuster published her first book, How to Be a Bad Bitch, in which she offers advice and personal anecdotes on everything from finances and career to love and fashion. The cover features an image shot by famed photographer David LaChapelle.

In 2015, Rose filmed "Walk of No Shame with Amber Rose" with Funny or Die. The viral video helped promote Rose's SlutWalk, which took place on October 3, 2015, in Los Angeles, California. In March 2016, Rose launched an emoji app called MuvaMoji, featuring 900 emoji icons that she curated.
In May 2016, it was announced that Rose would star in her own talk show entitled The Amber Rose Show on VH1, which debuted on July 8, 2016. On September 8, 2016, Rose began hosting Loveline.

Dancing with the Stars 
On August 30, 2016, Rose was announced as one of the celebrities who would compete on the 23rd season of Dancing with the Stars. She was partnered with professional dancer Maksim Chmerkovskiy. They were eliminated on October 17 and finished in ninth place.

Personal life

Relationships 
Rose dated rapper Kanye West for two years, starting in 2008.

She began dating rapper Wiz Khalifa in early 2011. The couple got engaged on March 1, 2012, and married on July 8, 2013. Their son was born in 2013. Rose, Khalifa, and their son divided their time between homes in Los Angeles and Canonsburg, Pennsylvania. Rose filed for divorce from Khalifa on September 22, 2014, citing irreconcilable differences and planned to take full custody of their son. As of 2015, Rose and Khalifa have joint custody of their son.

Rose dated Machine Gun Kelly in April 2015, they split up two months later.

Beginning in summer 2017, Rose was dating 21 Savage. As of March 2018, the couple have separated.

In 2009, in regard to her sexual orientation, Rose stated, "I'm extremely open with my sexuality. I can be in love with a woman, I can be in love with a man. As far as humans go, I definitely find beauty in everybody, whether they're heavy-set, super-skinny, if they're white, black, Indian, Asian, Spanish. I can see beauty in anybody. If I see a woman and I think she's beautiful and I like her, and she likes me back we can definitely try to be in a relationship together." In 2016, Rose disclosed to guest Margaret Cho during an episode of her podcast Love Line with Amber Rose that she once dated a trans man. 

On April 3, 2019, Rose disclosed via an Instagram post that she is expecting a baby boy with Def Jam record label executive Alexander Edwards. In October 2019, Rose gave birth to a son.

SlutWalk 
On October 3, 2015, Rose led the Los Angeles-based SlutWalk to honor all women who have been judged and demeaned for their sexual behavior. As part of the event, Rose spoke publicly about the instances of shaming she has experienced, specifically mentioning an incident at the age of 14, when a male classmate pulled his genitals out while in a closet with her playing the kissing game "seven minutes in heaven". Rose related that he tricked her into kneeling down in front of him, then threw open the closet door for all of their friends to see, suggesting oral sex had taken place. Rose grew visibly agitated while speaking about the bullying that followed, demonstrating for her audience the depth of the trauma the experience caused.

Rose has since been associated with the event annually.

Filmography

References

External links 

 

Amber Rose at SKAM Artist

1983 births
Living people
Actresses from Philadelphia
American cosmetics businesspeople
American female erotic dancers
American erotic dancers
American people of Cape Verdean descent
American people of Irish descent
American people of Italian descent
American people of Scottish descent
American women podcasters
American podcasters
American socialites
21st-century American actresses
Hip hop models
Businesspeople from Pennsylvania
Musicians from Philadelphia
People from Canonsburg, Pennsylvania
LGBT people from Pennsylvania
LGBT actresses
21st-century LGBT people